Palau-solità i Plegamans is a municipality and town in the comarca of Vallès Occidental, province of Barcelona, in the autonomous community of Catalonia, Spain.  It lies approximately 15 km from Sabadell and Granollers and 25 kilometres north of the city of Barcelona. The name results from the union of the former settlements of Palau-solità and Plegamans.
Palau-solità i Plegamans is the location of the headquarters of the Mango fashion company.

Broadcasting station 
At Palau-solità i Plegamans there is a powerful medium wave transmitter of Radio Nacional de España. It transmits on 576 kHz the program of RNE-5 at 100 kW and on 738 kHz the program of RNE-1 at 500 kW. For both frequencies a single 217-metre guyed mast radiator is located at 41°33'32" N, 2°11'21"E.

References

External links
 
 Government data pages 

S

Municipalities in Vallès Occidental